The 2001 Global Crossing at the Glen was the 22nd stock car race of the 2001 NASCAR Winston Cup Series and the 16th iteration of the event. The race was held on Sunday, August 12, 2001, at the shortened layout of Watkins Glen International, a 2.454 miles (3.949 km) permanent road course layout. The race took the scheduled 90 laps to complete. For the final two restarts, Hendrick Motorsports, driver Jeff Gordon would fend off against eventual second-place finisher, Roush Racing driver Jeff Burton to win a close race. The win was Gordon's 57th career victory and his fifth of the season. To fill out the podium, Jeremy Mayfield, driving for Penske Racing South, would finish third.

Background 

Watkins Glen International (nicknamed "The Glen") is an automobile race track located in Watkins Glen, New York at the southern tip of Seneca Lake. It was long known around the world as the home of the Formula One United States Grand Prix, which it hosted for twenty consecutive years (1961–1980), but the site has been home to road racing of nearly every class, including the World Sportscar Championship, Trans-Am, Can-Am, NASCAR Sprint Cup Series, the International Motor Sports Association and the IndyCar Series.

Initially, public roads in the village were used for the race course. In 1956 a permanent circuit for the race was built. In 1968 the race was extended to six hours, becoming the 6 Hours of Watkins Glen. The circuit's current layout has more or less been the same since 1971, although a chicane was installed at the uphill Esses in 1975 to slow cars through these corners, where there was a fatality during practice at the 1973 United States Grand Prix. The chicane was removed in 1985, but another chicane called the "Inner Loop" was installed in 1992 after J.D. McDuffie's fatal accident during the previous year's NASCAR Winston Cup event.

The circuit is known as the Mecca of North American road racing and is a very popular venue among fans and drivers. The facility is currently owned by International Speedway Corporation.

Entry list 

 (R) denotes rookie driver.

Practice

First practice 
The first practice session was held on Friday, August 10, at 11:20 AM EST. The session would last for two hours.

Second practice 
The second practice session was held on Saturday, August 11, at 10:45 AM EST. The session would last for 45 minutes.

Third and final practice 
The final practice session, sometimes referred to as Happy Hour, was held on Saturday, August 11, at 12:10 PM EST. The session would last for 50 minutes.

Qualifying 
Qualifying was held on Friday, August 10, at 3:05 PM EST. Each driver would have two laps to set a fastest time; the fastest of the two would count as their official qualifying lap. Positions 1-36 would be decided on time, while positions 37-43 would be based on provisionals. Six spots are awarded by the use of provisionals based on owner's points. The seventh is awarded to a past champion who has not otherwise qualified for the race. If no past champ needs the provisional, the next team in the owner points will be awarded a provisional.

Two drivers would fail to qualify: Mike Wallace and Wally Dallenbach Jr.

Full qualifying results

Race results

References 

2001 NASCAR Winston Cup Series
NASCAR races at Watkins Glen International
August 2001 sports events in the United States
2001 in sports in New York (state)